"Brilliant Conversationalist" is a song written by John Hadley, and Gary Nicholson, and recorded by American country music artist T. Graham Brown.  It was released in May 1987 as the first single and title track from the album Brilliant Conversationalist.  The song reached number nine on the Billboard Hot Country Singles & Tracks chart.

Charts

References

1987 singles
1987 songs
T. Graham Brown songs
Songs written by Gary Nicholson
Capitol Records Nashville singles